Galina Eduardovna Danilova (born 2 May 1968) is a Russian actress.

Biography 
Galina Danilova was born in Yoshkar-Ola and raised in the village of Yudino (Kazan), Russia. During school years she always played major roles in school theatrical productions. After graduation she was admitted to Kazan Theatre School. She moved to Moscow in 1989 where she worked in Satyricon theater. Her work includes: "Threepenny Opera", "Jacques and his master", "Extremaduran killer" and "The Thief of Bagdad" among others.

Personal life 
Galina married for the fourth time on July 13, 2011. Her husband is Sekhun Ezber.

She has two children, a son Nikita Popov (b. 1989) from her first marriage to Vladimir Popov, and a daughter Ulyana Koltakova (b. 2001, also like her mother is a character actress) from her third marriage to Dmitry Koltakov.

Selected filmography 
 2005 Oh, frost, frost! - Mama
 2006-2007 Kadetstvo (TV Series) - mother cadets Andrey Levakov
 2006 Worm - mother Sergei
 2006-2008 Happy Together (TV Series) - Zinaida
 2006-2008 Who's the Boss? (TV Series) - episodes
 2008 Where are the children? (TV) - fellow traveler with baby
 2008 Provincial (TV Series) - Mariya Ladova
 2008 New Rate - harmful aunt in the bus
 2008-2013 Daddy's Daughters (TV Series) - Galina Sergeevna, mother Polezhaykina
 2008 Step by step (TV Series) - Katya, wife of Viti
 2008 Protection against - Valentina Fyodorovna
 2010 Basic version - Pribylovskiy
 2010 Yolki - girlfriend Yulia
 2011 Moscow - not Moscow - Nina, wife Zotov
 2011 Maiden hunting (TV Series) - Jeanne Molchanova
 2013 Love does not love'' (TV series) - Ludmila, mother Lёli

References

External links 
 

1968 births
Living people
Russian film actresses
Russian television actresses
Russian stage actresses
Russian women comedians